Worst Case Scenario was a comedy horror film to be directed by Dutch director Richard Raaphorst.

Plot
The story tells of a fictional 2006 FIFA World Cup Finale between Germany and Netherlands. When the team from Germany loses, it is followed by an invasion of  Nazi zombies. A small group of friends moves away from the nationwide madness, to a North Sea island where a horde of Nazi zombies wait.

Production
The film began shooting in 2004, two years later in 2006 Gorehound Inc. released a teaser and a trailer. The film's trailer was released in a limited promo version on DVD and was nominated for the Golden Trailer Awards 2005 in the category "Best Movie Trailer". After many financial problems the film was canceled in March 2009, and Richard Raaphorst began working on Frankenstein's Army (2013).

See also 
 List of zombie short films and undead-related projects

References

External links
 
 

Nazi zombie films
2000s comedy horror films
Dutch satirical films
2000s unfinished films
Dutch comedy horror films
Cancelled films
2000s Dutch-language films